Don Reynolds (born 1953) was a baseball player.

Don or Donald Reynolds may also refer to:

Don Reynolds (actor) (1937–2019), American child actor and animal trainer
Don Reynolds (producer), producer of the film The Quiet Earth
Donald W. Reynolds (1906–1993), American businessman and philanthropist
Donn Reynolds (1921–1997), Canadian country music singer and songwriter
 Don Reynolds, Dino Spumoni's partner on Hey Arnold!